Michele E. Goins was the chief information officer and senior vice president of Juniper Networks, a multinational networking products company.

Early life and education 
Goins holds a B.S.C.S. degree in electrical engineering from Santa Clara University and earned an M.B.A. from Northeastern University — Graduate School of Business Administration . She has been recognized as one of the top 50 Hispanics in business and technology by several Hispanic magazines, including Hispanic Engineer & Information Technology in 2003 and Hispanic Business in 2008.

Career 
Goins was the vice president and CIO for the $30 billion-a-year division, Imaging and Printing Group (IPG) at Hewlett Packard (HP), where she served in a number of executive positions during her 25-year tenure. At HP, she provided services including information technology, acquisition integration, manufacturing, sales, marketing, and engineering.

In 2008, Goins replaced Alan Boehme, who was seriously injured in a car accident in February 2007, as the chief information officer of Juniper Networks.

References 

Juniper Networks
Living people
Computer networking people
Chief information officers
Northeastern University alumni
Santa Clara University alumni
Year of birth missing (living people)